The 13 Kohanic Cities are the 13 cities/villages and their respective peripheral territory listed in the Book of Joshua as having been allocated by Elazar and Joshua to the kohanim (Israelite priesthood) and their families. The Kohanic cities are a sub-set of the 48 Levitical cities allocated to sections of the Tribe of Levi.

Biblical references

The Kohanic cities all come along with the detail ואת מגרשה ("the peripheral land around the city") - presumably, this amount is 2000 amah in all directions. These 13 cities are the primary land allotments for kohanim in the Land of Israel and were in use from the initial entry of the children of Israel into the land of Israel up until they were depopulated by Nebuchadnezzar.

According to the Books of Ezra and Nehemiah, these 13 cities where re-inhabited by the kohanim upon their return from the 70-year term of the Babylonian exile.

Land lists
The areas listed:

אֶת חֶבְרוֹן וְאֶת מִגְרָשֶׁהָ Hebron and its periphery
וְאֶת לִבְנָה וְאֶת מִגְרָשֶׁהָ Livna and its periphery
וְאֶת יַתִּר וְאֶת מִגְרָשֶׁהָ Yatir and its periphery
וְאֶת אֶשְׁתְּמֹעַ וְאֶת מִגְרָשֶׁהָ Eshtemoa and its periphery
וְאֶת חֹלֹן וְאֶת מִגְרָשֶׁהָ Holon and its periphery
וְאֶת דְּבִר וְאֶת מִגְרָשֶׁהָ Devir and its periphery
וְאֶת עַיִן וְאֶת מִגְרָשֶׁהָ Ayin and its periphery
וְאֶת יֻטָּה וְאֶת מִגְרָשֶׁהָ Yutah and its periphery
אֶת בֵּית שֶׁמֶשׁ וְאֶת מִגְרָשֶׁהָ Bet Shemesh and its periphery
אֶת גִּבְעוֹן וְאֶת מִגְרָשֶׁהָ Giv’on and its periphery
אֶת גֶּבַע וְאֶת מִגְרָשֶׁהָ Geva and its periphery
אֶת עֲנָתוֹת וְאֶת מִגְרָשֶׁהָ Anatot and its periphery
וְאֶת עַלְמוֹן וְאֶת מִגְרָשֶׁהָ Almon and its periphery

External links
kehuna.org - Cities and territories of Kohanim in the Land of Israel

 
Priesthood (Judaism)
Levitical cities